Electrostatic discharge materials (ESD materials) are plastics that reduce static electricity to protect against damage to electrostatic-sensitive devices (ESD) or to prevent the accidental ignition of flammable liquids or gases.

Materials
ESD materials are generally subdivided into categories with related properties: Anti-Static, Conductive, and Dissipative.

Note that the sheet resistance quoted above depends on the thickness of the layer of material, and the value is the resistance of a square of the material for a current flowing from one edge to the opposite edge.

Conductive 
Conductive materials have a low electrical resistance, thus electrons flow easily across the surface or through these materials.  Charges go to ground or to another conductive object that the material contacts.

Dissipative
Dissipative materials allow the charges to flow to ground more slowly in a more controlled manner than with conductive materials.

Anti-Static
Anti-static materials are generally referred to as any material which inhibits triboelectric charging.  This kind of charging is the buildup of an electric charge by the rubbing or contact with another material.

Insulative 
Insulative materials prevent or limit the flow of electrons across their surface or through their volume.  Insulative materials have a high electrical resistance and are difficult to ground, thus are not ESD materials.  Static charges remain in place on these materials for a very long time.

See also

 Antistatic device
 Electrostatic discharge
 Electrical resistivity and conductivity
 Velostat

References

Further reading
 The Wiley Encyclopedia of Packaging Technology; 1st Edition; Kit. L. Yam; John Wiley & Sons; 1353 pages; 2009; .
 Plastics Additives Handbook; 6th Edition; Zweifel, Maier, Schiller; Hanser Publications; 1222 pages; 2009; .
 Handbook of Conducting Polymers; 3rd Edition; Skotheim and Reynolds; CRC Press; 1680 pages; 2007; .
 Conductive Polymers and Plastics: In Industrial Applications; 1st Edition; Larry Rupprecht; Elsevier; 293 pages; 1999; .
 Plastics Additives and Modifiers Handbook ; 1st Edition; Jesse Edenbaum; Springer; 1136 pages; 1992; .
 Metal-Filled Polymers: Properties and Applications; 1st Edition; S.K. Bhattacharya; CRC Press; 376 pages; 1986; .

External links
 http://www.esda.org - ESD Association
 ESD packaging advice - Intel
 Workmanship Manual for Electrostatic Discharge Control  - NASA

Electrostatics
Digital electronics

de:Elektrostatische_Entladung#Klassifikation_der_Werkstoffe